Nikita Igorevich Telenkov (born 29 May 1987) is a Russian professional football player. He plays for Zenit-Izhevsk.

Club career
He made his Russian Football National League debut for FC Tyumen on 12 July 2014 in a game against FC Gazovik Orenburg.

External links
 

1987 births
People from Naberezhnye Chelny
Living people
Russian footballers
Association football midfielders
FC Tyumen players
FC Neftekhimik Nizhnekamsk players
FC Nosta Novotroitsk players
FC Volga Ulyanovsk players
FC Zenit-Izhevsk players
Russian First League players
Russian Second League players
Sportspeople from Tatarstan